FK Bregalnica Delčevo was a football club based in Delčevo, Republic of Macedonia.

History
The club was founded in 1926. 

In summer 2014, the club ceased to exist as no sponsor wanted to help.

A successor club which claims rights to Bregalnica Delčevo's honours and records was established in same year as Bregalnica Golak. However, they are not legally considered to be successors to the original Bregalnica Delchevo and the two clubs' track records and honours are kept separate by the Football Federation of North Macedonia.

Supporters
Bregalnica Delčevo supporters were called Aramii.

References

External links
Football Federation of Macedonia 

Defunct football clubs in North Macedonia
Association football clubs established in 1926
Association football clubs disestablished in 2012
1926 establishments in Yugoslavia
2012 disestablishments in the Republic of Macedonia